Nostalgia is a 1984 sculpture by Ramiz Barquet, installed along Puerto Vallarta's Malecón, in the Mexican state of Jalisco.

See also

 1984 in art

References

External links
 

1984 sculptures
Centro, Puerto Vallarta
Outdoor sculptures in Puerto Vallarta
Statues in Jalisco